Harby Hill Wood is a  biological Site of Special Scientific Interest west of Eastwell in Leicestershire.

This site has steeply sloping ash and sycamore woodland, with areas of spring-fed marsh and colonies of wild daffodils. There is also an area of species-rich dry grassland, which has flora such as pignut and musk thistle.

The site is private land but it is crossed by public footpaths.

References

Sites of Special Scientific Interest in Leicestershire